Michael Gross (born 1963) is a science writer based at Oxford and an honorary research fellow at the School of Crystallography, Birkbeck, University of London.

Biography 
He holds a degree in chemistry and a doctorate in natural sciences, both from Regensburg University, Germany. During seven years of post-doctoral research in protein biochemistry at the University of Oxford, he wrote science journalism as a hobby. In 2000, he switched to writing full-time. Occasionally he also acts as a translator, editor, and lecturer.

Works 
Michael Gross is the author of around 30 research papers, over 700 journalistic pieces, and seven books, including Life on the Edge, Travels to the Nanoworld, and Light and Life. He writes in English and German and parts of his work have been translated into French, Spanish and Italian. He is married with three children and lives in Oxford.

External links
Personal homepage
Blog
Autobiography

References

Reviews of Life on the Edge in Nature (393, 227, 21.5.1998), New Scientist (15.8.1998),  Trends in Biotechnology, Trends in Microbiology
Reviews of Travels to the Nanoworld in Nature (402, 119, 11.11.1999), Chemistry & Industry (6.12.1999)
Career profile in Science’s Next Wave, 29.3.2003: Science Writer in Residence.

British science journalists
1963 births
Living people
Academics of Birkbeck, University of London
British science writers
University of Regensburg alumni